A knockbox (informally known as a "bash bin", "coffee column", "slam piece" or "bang bang") is a device used to store spent espresso grounds, called a puck, after a shot of espresso has been pulled.  It is generally made out of stainless steel or plastic, and has a sturdy bar known as a "bash bar", against which a portafilter is tapped to release the puck.  Because the espresso puck is typically very hot after extraction, knockboxes need to be sturdy.  Further, they are also subject to repetitive knocking and tapping to dislodge espresso after use, and thus rubber and stainless steel are the most commonly used materials. In various coffee houses they are seen as drawers which are integral within the bar structure, or as stainless steel boxes usually located near the grinder for convenience.

See also

References 

Containers
Espresso